José Manuel Osório (born 27 September 1987) is a Mexican professional boxer. He is promoted by Saúl Álvarez' company Canelo Promotions.

Professional career
On October 1, 2010 García beat the undefeated Victor Guzman, the bout was held at the Arena Jalisco in Guadalajara.

His next fight will be against Colombian veteran Alexander Monterrosa on the undercard of Saúl Álvarez vs. Ryan Rhodes.

References

Boxers from Jalisco
Sportspeople from Guadalajara, Jalisco
Super-featherweight boxers
1987 births
Living people
Mexican male boxers